The following highways are numbered 464:

Canada
Manitoba Provincial Road 464

Japan
 Japan National Route 464

United States
  Interstate 464
  Arizona State Route 464 (former)
  Florida State Road 464
  Kentucky Route 464
  Maryland Route 464
  Puerto Rico Highway 464
 Texas:
  Texas State Highway Loop 464
  Farm to Market Road 465